Munkás ('The Worker') was a Hungarian-language newspaper in Czechoslovakia. The newspaper, which was an organ of the Communist Party of Czechoslovakia, was one of the major Hungarian newspapers in Czechoslovakia in the latter half of the 1930s.

References

Communist newspapers
Communist Party of Czechoslovakia
Defunct newspapers published in Czechoslovakia
Hungarian-language newspapers
Publications with year of disestablishment missing
Publications with year of establishment missing